Witness to Apartheid is a 1986 American documentary film directed by  Sharon I. Sopher. It was nominated for an Academy Award for Best Documentary Feature.  Written by Sopher and Peter Kinoy, the film also won a Cine Golden Eagle. Sopher also won an Emmy Award for its direction.

References

External links

Apartheid films
1986 films
American documentary films
Documentary films about apartheid
1986 documentary films
1980s English-language films
1980s American films